Book of Mormon characters may refer to
People featured in the Book of Mormon
The written language of the Book of Mormon
Characters in The Book of Mormon musical